Ryn is a town in Warmian-Masurian Voivodeship (north Poland)

Ryn may refer to the following places:
Ryn, Ostróda County, a village in Warmian-Masurian Voivodeship (north Poland)
Ryn, Greater Poland Voivodeship, a village in west-central Poland
The Ryn Desert, in western Kazakhstan
Ryn, a fictional Star Wars race

See also
 RYN (disambiguation)
 Van Ryn, a Dutch surname (including a list of people with the name)
 Claes G. Ryn, Swedish-born American academic and educator
 Ryn Weaver, American singer
Ryn Fisher, a fictional character in the Siren TV series
 Rynn
 Rhyn